Essen Zollverein Nord is a railway station situated in close proximity to the Zollverein Coal Mine Industrial Complex on the Duisburg–Dortmund railway situated in Essen in the German state of North Rhine-Westphalia. It is classified by Deutsche Bahn as a category 6 station. It was originally named Zollverein, renamed Caternberg in 1897, Caternberg Süd between 1897 and 1905, Katernberg Süd between 1905 and 1912, Essen-Katernberg Süd in 1949 and Essen-Zollverein Nord on 13 December 2009. A station building was built in 1897, but was demolished between 1960 and 1990.

It is served by Regionalbahn lines RB32 (Rhein-Emscher-Bahn) and RB35 (Emscher-Niederrhein-Bahn), Essen tramway 107 (Gelsenkirchen Hbf + Hbf – Bredeney) and by bus routes 170 (Schonnebeck – Kray – Steele + Altenessen - Borbeck) and 183 (Katernberger Markt + Altenessen – Karlsplatz) operated by Ruhrbahn.

References 

S2 (Rhine-Ruhr S-Bahn)
Rhine-Ruhr S-Bahn stations
Zollverein Nord
Railway stations in Germany opened in 1887